The Thirlmere Roosters Rugby League Football Club is an Australian rugby league football club based in Thirlmere, New South Wales, formed in 1976. They currently play in the Group 6 Rugby League competition.

Thirlmere, with its maroon and gold strip were a 1914 foundation club in the Berrima District Rugby League competition, becoming a 1st division team of the Group 6 Rugby League in 1946.
The junior teams are the Thirlmere-Tahmoor Roosters.

Notable players 
Yileen Gordon
Eddie Paea
Lelea Paea
Matt Groat
Sione Kite
Jacob Loko
Jake Mullaney
Anthony Cherrington
Sione Tovo
Blake Ferguson

See also

References

External links
Thirlmere Roosters website

Rugby league teams in Sydney
Rugby clubs established in 1953
1953 establishments in Australia
Thirlmere, New South Wales